The Albin 7.8, also known as the Albin Cirrus and the Cirrus 7.8, is a Swedish sailboat that was designed by Peter Norlin and first built in 1979.

Production
The design was built by Albin Marine in Sweden between 1979 and 1984, but it is now out of production.

Design
The Albin 7.8 is a recreational keelboat, built predominantly of fibreglass. It has a fractional sloop rig, a raked stem, a reverse transom, a transom-hung rudder controlled by a tiller and a fixed fin keel. It displaces  and carries  of ballast.

The boat is fitted with a Swedish Volvo Penta MD5 diesel engine for docking and manoeuvring.

Operational history
The boat was at one time supported by an active class club based in Sweden that organized racing events, the Albin 78 Klubben (English: Albin 78 Club).

See also
List of sailing boat types

References

External links
Photo of a Cirrus 7.8 showing the bow
Photo of a Cirrus 7.8 showing the transom
Cirrus 7.8 sailing video

Keelboats
1970s sailboat type designs
Sailing yachts
Sailboat type designs by Peter Norlin
Sailboat types built by Albin Marine